The 2e régiment de chevau-légers lanciers de la Garde Impériale (English: 2nd Regiment of Light Cavalry Lancers of the Imperial Guard) was a light cavalry regiment in Napoleon I's Imperial Guard.
They were formed in 1810, after the Kingdom of Holland was annexed by France, but their original purpose was to serve as hussars of the Dutch Royal Guard. The units, who were of an elite order, were known for their loyalty and military might, as well as their professionalism in and out of battle.

Origin

At the time of its annexation by France in 1810, the Royal Guard of the Kingdom of Holland contained a battalion of grenadiers and a regiment of horse guards that combined squadrons of cuirassiers and hussars. Napoleon decreed that these men would transfer to the Imperial Guard, with the infantry becoming the 3e Régiment de Grenadiers-à-Pied and the cavalry retraining to become a new regiment of lancers modelled on the existing Polish regiment. They were given a new scarlet uniform (copied, except the colour, from Polish lancers uniform). They also received a new leader - Col. Baron Pierre David de Colbert-Chabanais - under whom they were known formally as the 2nd Light Horse Lancers of the Imperial Guard (2e régiment de chevaux-légers des Lanciers de la Garde Impériale).

Campaigns

However, despite their previous posts in the Netherlands as the Royal Guards, they suffered enormous losses in the first invasion they participated in, which was that of Russia in 1812. While the devastation for the regiment at that particular conflict almost caused the entire dissolution of the newly formed unit, they would continue to serve in the military, but without many of the original Dutchmen, who were thought of as the pride of the regiment and who would be replaced by French soldiers.

The following year, in 1813, the Red Lancers were a distinguished regiment in a battle in Germany, and once again, in 1814, where they fought in the areas then known as the Low Countries.

The next year after that, in 1815, Napoleon returned from his exile. The same year, the Red Lancers fought at Waterloo. Even though Dutch-Belgian cavalry commander Jean Baptiste van Merlen, one of the most highly ranked and celebrated army officers of the regiment, lost his life at Waterloo, some of the original Dutchmen still existed in the ranks, and would serve as Red Lancers long after the French defeat there.

Uniform 
The Chevau-Léger Lanciers wore a red coat with blue lapels, cuffs and turnbacks. They wore a red piped yellow Polish shako. They had yellow aiguillettes and epaulettes.
The trumpeters wore a white coat with red lapels, cuffs and turnbacks. They wore a white Polish shako and rode grey horses.

Notes 

Regiments of Napoleon I's Imperial Guard
Cavalry regiments of France
Regiments of the Netherlands
Disbanded units and formations of France
Military units and formations established in 1810
Military units and formations disestablished in 1815